Kuusisaari (Finnish), Granö (Swedish) is an island and a neighborhood of Helsinki, Finland. It has the highest average income of all the Helsinki metropolitan area. Many foreign embassies are located in Kuusisaari. 

Munkkiniemi
Diplomatic districts